Hiroshi Koike (小池博史 Koike Hiroshi born on 25 January 1956, in Japan) is a Japanese director, playwright and choreographer. After his former performing arts group, Pappa TARAHUMARA was dissolved in 2012, he formed Hiroshi Koike Bridge Project (HKBP).

Hiroshi is best known for his unique blend of aesthetics and physical theatre. He has conducted physical acting training workshops based on his original method titled “slow movement” all over the world  



Career 
Koike was born in Hitachi-shi, Ibaraki. When he came to Tokyo, in order to take a college entrance examination for the department of architecture, he was shocked when he saw a film directed by Federico Fellini. As a result of that he changed his mind and became determined to be a film director. While studying sociology at Hitotsubashi University, he started to produce a play, rather than a film, because he was told that "movies and theater are the same" by his friends, and ended up hosting a student theater company.

After graduating from university, he worked as a TV director of documentary programs, but left the company after two years. In 1982 he founded Pappa TARAHUMARA with Ogawa Michiko and other friends from college. Koike was involved in all 55 productions of the group as the director, playwright, and choreographer for 30 years until 2012.

After the 2011 Tōhoku earthquake and tsunami, he decided to dissolve the group in 2012; Koike claimed feeling trapped by Japan and Japanese cultural administration spurred his decision. In the same year, the group held the Papa-Tara Final Festival. In June, soon after the dissolution of Pappa TARAHUMARA, he established the Hiroshi Koike Bridge Project (HKBP). Focusing on education, publication, and creation with creativity as the core, HKBP has been strongly aware of "cross-cultural" and "multicultural," and experienced a number of international collaborative projects. Since 2013, HKBP has been working on a theater adaptation of the ancient epic Mahabharata with artists from various Asian countries for 8 years. Other productions of HKBP include: The Restaurant of Many Orders, which is based on Kenji Miyazawa's novel, and World Series, in which Koike deeply deals with social problems today with his unique "sensory approach."

Koike has been known for his unique artistic approach, which is beyond conventional genres such as drama, dance and visual arts. His productions have been highly acclaimed worldwide and have been invited by several international festivals and theaters such as the Next Wave Festival at the Brooklyn Academy of Music. Koike's works have been performed in 40 countries. In addition to his work with many international artists and productions all over the world, he has also conducted workshops for professional artists and citizens.

Koike has served Tsukuba Art Center as the artistic director from 1997 to 2004, the Asian Performing Arts Forum as a member of the executive committee in 1998, and Japan Foundation as the member of the Special Donation Council from 2005 to 2011. In 1995 Koike established a school for performing arts, PAI, of which he is the president.

Slow movement 
By converting every movement to a speed of 1/100 or less of the daily speed and communicating in a slow movement, it is said to deepen the awareness of one's "body". Advocated a method called "slow movement". From the idea that "the brain that thinks and the mind that feels, the internal organs and muscles, the arms, the legs, the head, etc. are all included in the'body'", "feel the whole" body "and feel others and things. The purpose is to draw out new ideas and ideas from the depths of oneself by feeling the relationship with the space and awakening the sleeping sensibilities. In addition, based on this method, many workshops for professionals and citizens are held in Japan and overseas. This workshop has been held in 25 countries around the world. Also, at the workshop, regardless of long-term or short-term, he always makes a work and finally makes a presentation.

Major works

Pappa TARAHUMARA 
1982 In Honor of the Fragile Thing
1983 Opera in the Dark, La Mangeuse – The Woman Who Eats, Typo – A Life in 5,400 Seconds
1984 Sleep in the Sun, The Black Solar Game, Colors’ Dance
1985 Mary in Blue, Picnic on the Shore
1986 MONK
1987 Pocket of Fever, ALEJO – To Praise the Wind
1988 Zoo of the Sea
1989 Parade
1991 Stone Age
1992 The Bush of Ghost
1994 AO-Blue
1995 Archeology of MACBETH
1996 KUSAMEIKYU – Water Moon Mirror Flower *collaborative project with Zuni
1997 SHIP IN A VIEW, Island
1998 Spring Day
2001 WD, Love Letter
2002 Birds on Board, The Sound of Future SYNC
2003 Blue Brain Bull, Street of Crocodiles Project 1, Spring in Kuala Lumpur
2005 Three Sisters, Heart of Gold-One Hundred Years of Solitude
2006 My Blue Sky, Pappa TARAHUMARA's "Cinderella"
2007 Tokyo⇔Buenos Aires LETTERS
2008 New “Cinderella”, Gulliver& Swift-Writer Jonathan Swift's Cat Cooking Recipes-
2009 Garibaba's strange World, Punk Don Quixote
2010 Nobody, NO BODY, Swift sweets, Snow White
2011 Between the Line

Hiroshi Koike Bridge Project 
2012 The Restaurant of Many Orders
2013 Mahabharata Part 1
2014 Milky Way Train, Odyssey of Wind
2015 Mahabharata Part 2, Mahabharata Part 2.5
2016 Mahabharata Part 3
2017 World Conference, Mahabharata Part 4
2018 2030 World Drifting, Strawberry Fields
2019 Vagabond~SAKURAGAWA, Endless BRIDGE~The Mhabharata, Fools on the Hill
2020 Seven Nights' Dream
2021 The Mhabharata~Chapter of Desire/Chapter of Tempest

Publications 
 Long Goodbye – Pappa TARAHUMARA and Its Era (Seigensha Art Publishing, 2011)
 Listen to the Body (Shinchosha, 2013)
 What's Performing Arts? (Suiseisha, 2017)
 The Journey to the Night and the End of the World – The Collection Book of Hiroshi Koike's Works (Suiseisha, 2017)

References

External links 

 Official Website for Hiroshi Koike Bridge Project
 Official Website for Pappa TARAHUMARA
 Official Website of Papa-Tara Final Festival

1956 births
Japanese theatre directors
20th-century Japanese dramatists and playwrights
21st-century Japanese dramatists and playwrights
Japanese choreographers
People from Hitachi, Ibaraki
Living people